Christophe Oriol (born 28 February 1973) is a former French cyclist.

Career achievements

Major results

1997
1st Circuit de Saône-et-Loire
1998
1st Tour des Pyrénées
1999
1st stage 1 Critérium du Dauphiné Libéré
2nd Circuit de Lorraine
2001
3rd Tour de l'Ain
1st stage 4
2002
1st Tour de l'Ain
1st stage 3
2004
3rd Polynormande

Grand Tour general classification results timeline

References

1973 births
Living people
French male cyclists
People from Oullins
Sportspeople from Lyon Metropolis
Cyclists from Auvergne-Rhône-Alpes